Preez or du Preez may refer to:
Cornell du Preez, South African rugby player
Dillon du Preez, South African cricketer
Fourie du Preez, South African rugby player
Frik du Preez, former South African rugby player
Jackie du Preez, South African cricketer
Jan du Preez, former South African rugby player
Michau du Preez, Namibian cricketer
Pieter du Preez, South African athlete